Finn Arild Hvistendahl (born 12 February 1942) is a Norwegian businessperson.

He graduated as siv.ing. in 1964, and worked in Norsk Hydro from 1966 to 1968, in Dyno Industrier from 1968 to 1971 and again in Norsk Hydro from 1971 to 1991. He was then CEO of Den norske Bank from 1991 to 1998. He was chairman of the board of Orkla from 2000 to 2001 and the Financial Supervisory Authority of Norway from 2002.

He is a fellow of the Norwegian Academy of Technological Sciences.

References

1942 births
Living people
Norwegian businesspeople
Norsk Hydro people
DNB ASA people
Orkla ASA people
Members of the Norwegian Academy of Technological Sciences